Handball is a video game series released by Nacon. It is a simulator for handball.

Handball 16 
 Cover athlete: Uwe Gensheimer
 Released for: Microsoft Windows, PlayStation Vita, PlayStation 3, PlayStation 4, Xbox 360, Xbox One
 Release date: 7 November 2015

The players did not match the real players and there were no away Trikots. These results that teams played in the same color.

Handball 17 
 Cover athlete: Thierry Omeyer
 Released for: Microsoft Windows, PlayStation 3, PlayStation 4, Xbox One
 Release date: 11 November 2016
Handball 17 had additionally the second league from France.

It also had negative critics. kicker wrote that the new version is worse than the old one.

Handball 21 
 Cover athlete: Mikkel Hansen
 Released for: Microsoft Windows, PlayStation 4, Xbox One
 Release date:  November 2020
Handball 20 features four major European leagues and several second divisions. 1,600 players are represented.

Leagues

References

External links 
Official website
Handball 16 (Bigben in German)
Handball 17 (Bigben in German)

Nacon franchises
Esports games
Handball culture
Video game franchises introduced in 2015
2015 video games
Video games developed in France
Sports video games
PlayStation 4 games
Windows games
Xbox One games